The Banruo Temple, also pronounced Bore, is a Buddhist temple located in Shenhe District of Shenyang, Liaoning, China. It is a Bhikkhuni temple.

History
The Banruo Temple was first established by monk Shi Gulin in 1684, in the reign of Kangxi Emperor in the Qing dynasty (1644–1912). The temple has been rebuilt two times in 1909 and 1924 successively.

In 1966, Mao Zedong launched the Cultural Revolution, most parts of Banruo Temple were slightly damaged under the attack of the Red Guards.

After the 3rd Plenary Session of the 11th Central Committee of the Chinese Communist Party, according to the national policy of free religious belief, Banruo Temple reactivated its religious activities and was officially reopened to the public. In 1983, Banruo Temple was authorized as a National Key Buddhist Temple in Han Chinese Area by the State Council of China. The local government repaired and renovated the complex. Banruo Temple was designated as a municipal level cultural relic preservation organ in 1985 and a provincial level key cultural heritage in 2015.

Architecture
The entire temple faces south and divided into two courtyards. The extant buildings include the Hall of Four Heavenly Kings, Mahavira Hall and Buddhist Texts Library.

Shanmen
Under the eaves of Shanmen is a plaque with the Chinese characters "Banruo Temple" written by calligrapher Feng Ri'an.

Hall of Four Heavenly Kings
The Maitreya Buddha, Skanda and Four Heavenly Kings' statues are enshrined in the Hall of Four Heavenly Kings.

Mahavira Hall
The Mahavira Hall is the second hall and most important hall in the temple. Statues of Sakyamuni (middle), Amitabha (left) and Bhaisajyaguru (right) are enshrined in the middle of the hall. At the back of their statues are paintings of Guanyin, Manjushri and Samantabhadra. In front of Sakyamuni stand Ananda and Kassapa Buddha on the left and right. Stone rubbings of Sixteen Arhats hang on both sides of the hall. In the center of the eaves of the hall is a plaque, on which there are the words "Mahavira Hall" written by calligrapher Huo Anrong.

Hall of Guru
The Hall of Guru was built in 1676. Paintings of 28 Buddhas enshrined in the hall.

References

Buddhist temples in Liaoning
Buildings and structures in Shenyang
Tourist attractions in Shenyang
17th-century establishments in China
17th-century Buddhist temples
Religious buildings and structures completed in 1684
Qing dynasty architecture